Raymond Austin is an English television and film director, television writer and producer, and former stunt performer and actor who has worked in both the United Kingdom and the United States.

Career
Austin started his career as a stunt performer on such films as North by Northwest (1959) and Spartacus (1960). From 1965 to 1967 he served as stunt coordinator on 50 episodes of The Avengers. For The Champions he initially became involved as a second unit director, subsequently rising to the position of full director.

His work as a TV director includes episodes of The Avengers (1968), Randall and Hopkirk (Deceased) (1969–70), Space: 1999 (1975–76), The New Avengers (1976–77), and V (1984). He directed 50 of the 88 episodes of the series Zorro, which was filmed in Madrid between 1989 and 1992 for the American ABC Family Channel. He has also directed some made-for-TV films, including The Return of the Man from U.N.C.L.E. (1983), and some feature films such as Virgin Witch (1972) and House of the Living Dead (1974).

The Guinness world record site states that "In 1965, Dame Diana Rigg (UK) became the first western actress to perform kung fu on Television when the combat choreographers Ray Austin (UK) and Chee Soo (UK/China) worked elements of the martial art into her fight scenes on The Avengers. Certificate presentation was done on The New Paul O'Grady Show."

Television

Stunts

 Highway Patrol, 1955–59 (stunt performer)
 Thunder Road, 1958 (stunt performer)
 North by Northwest, 1959 (stunt performer)
 Operation Petticoat, 1959 (stunt performer)
 Spartacus, 1960 (stunt performer)
 The Sundowners, 1960 (stunt performer)
 Have Gun – Will Travel, 1957–63 (performer)
 Peter Gunn, 1958–60, 1960–61 (performer)
 Guns of Navarone, 1961 (stunt performer)
 Saturday Night and Sunday Morning, 1961 (stunt arranger)
 The Loneliness of the Long Distance Runner, 1962 (stunt arranger)
 Tarzan, 1963 (stunt performer)
 Tom Jones, 1963 (stunt arranger)
 Cleopatra, 1963 (stunt arranger)
 The Dirty Dozen, 1967 (stunt performer)
 The Avengers (arranger)

Actor

 The Saint, 1963–64, 1966
 The Loneliness of the Long Distance Runner, 1962 (Mr Clay)
 Tom Jones, 1963 (Thug)
 Clash by Night, 1963 (Intruder)
 The V.I.P.s, 1963 (Chauffeur) 
 Ghost Squad, 1964
 The Avengers, 1965

Director

 The Baron, 1966
 The Saint, 1968 (2 episodes)
 The Avengers, 1968 (2 episodes)
 The Champions, 1968
 Journey to the Unknown, 1968–69
 The Ugliest Girl in Town, 1968–69
 Department S, 1969 (4 episodes)
 Randall and Hopkirk (Deceased), 1969–70 (6 episodes)
 Strange Report, 1971
 Shirley's World, 1971–72
 The Adventures of Black Beauty, 1974
 Space: 1999, 1975–76
 The New Avengers, 1976 (1 episode)
 The Hardy Boys/Nancy Drew Mysteries, 1977–79
 W.E.B., 1978
 The Professionals, 1978 (2 episodes)
 Return of the Saint, 1978 (1 episode)
 Barnaby Jones, 1978 (1 episode)
 Sword of Justice, 1978 (2 episodes)
 Vega$, 1978–81
 Salvage 1, 1979 (2 episodes)
 A Man Called Sloane, 1979 (1 episode)
 Hawaii Five-O, 1979 (1 episode)
 B. J. and the Bear, 1979–80 (1 episode)
 Hart to Hart, 1979–80, 1984 (5 episodes)
 Wonder Woman, 1979
 From Here to Eternity, 1980
 The Love Boat, 1980 (4 episodes)
 House Calls, 1980–82
 Quincy, M.E., 1981 (2 episodes)
 Magnum, P.I., 1981–86
 Simon & Simon, 1982 (2 episodes)
 Tales of the Gold Monkey, 1982 (pilot episode)
 The Mississippi, 1983–84
 The Return of the Man from U.N.C.L.E., 1983 (pilot)
 Jessie, 1984
 The Master, 1984
 Airwolf, 1984 (1 episode)
 The Fall Guy, 1984 (2 episodes)
 Lime Street, 1985, 1987 (5 episodes, including pilot)
 V, 1985 (1 episode)
 Our House, 1986–87
 The Return of the Six Million Dollar Man and the Bionic Woman, 1987 (film)
 Snoops, 1989
 The New Alfred Hitchcock Presents, 1989 (3 episode)
 Zorro, 1992
 The Boys of Twilight, 1992
 Highlander: The Series, 1992–93 (10 episode)
 Pensacola: Wings of Gold, 1997 (4 episode)
 CI5: The New Professionals, 1999 (5 episodes)

Writer

 Randall and Hopkirk (Deceased), 1969
 Department S, 1971
 Shirley's World, 1971–72
 The Adventures of Black Beauty, 1974
 Magnum, P.I., 1980–86
 Hart to Hart, 1984
 The Master, 1984
 The Zany Adventures of Robin Hood, 1984 (TV film)
 Airwolf, 1985
 Lime Street, 1985
 Spenser: For Hire, 1986
 Our House, 1986–88

Producer
 Shirley's World, 1971–72
 JAG, 1995–96, 1997
 The New Avengers
 Zorro

Film

Stunts
 North by Northwest, 1959 (stunt performer)
 Operation Petticoat, 1959 (stunt performer)
 Spartacus, 1960 (stunt performer)
 Saturday Night and Sunday Morning, 1961 (stunt arranger)
 The Loneliness of the Long Distance Runner, 1962 (stunt arranger)
 Cleopatra, 1963 (stunt arranger)
 Tom Jones, 1963 (stunt arranger)

Director
 Saturday Night and Sunday Morning, 1961 (second unit)
 Fun and Games, 1971
 Virgin Witch, 1972
 House of the Living Dead, 1973

Actor
 The Loneliness of the Long Distance Runner (1962) as Craig
 The V.I.P.s (1963) as Rolls-Royce chauffeur
 Clash by Night (1963) as Intruder

Novelist
Beauford Sloan Mysteries series:
 The Eagle Heist (2002)
 Dead Again (2002)
 Your Turn to Die (2006)
 Keep Running Or Die (2020)
 Love Loves A Mystery (2020)
 Home For The Holiday (2021)

Personal life
Austin was married from 1976 to actress Yasuko Nagazumi, who performed in some of the series he worked on, notably Space: 1999. He later divorced Nagazumi and married British producer and writer Wendy DeVere Knight-Wilton in 1984; they now live on their estate in Earlysville, Virginia.

References

External links
 
 

Living people
20th-century English male actors
20th-century English male writers
20th-century English screenwriters
21st-century English male writers
21st-century English novelists
Action choreographers
British male television writers
Crime novelists
English crime fiction writers
English expatriates in the United States
English male film actors
English male novelists
English male television actors
English mystery writers
English stunt performers
English television directors
English television producers
English television writers
Film directors from London
Male actors from London
Novelists from Virginia
People from Albemarle County, Virginia
Screenwriters from Virginia
Television producers from Virginia
Writers from London
Year of birth missing (living people)